The Meralco Bolts is a professional basketball team in the Philippine Basketball Association. The team began in 2010 after the Manila Electric Company (MERALCO) acquired the PBA franchise of the Sta. Lucia Realtors. The team is one of three PBA teams presently under the control of businessman Manuel V. Pangilinan – the other teams being the TNT Tropang Giga and the NLEX Road Warriors.

History

MICAA days

The MERALCO Reddy Kilowatts was a powerhouse basketball team that played in the Manila Industrial and Commercial Athletic Association (MICAA) from 1968 to 1972. Operated by the MERALCO Athletic Club of the Manila Electric Company (MERALCO), they briefly joined the MICAA prior to World War II and was re-admitted in 1968. The team was crowned as the 1971 MICAA Open champions, beating the Crispa Redmanizers.

The demise of the YCO-Ysmael Steel rivalry following the breakup of the Ysmael Steel team in 1968, paved the way for the MERALCO-Crispa rivalry starting in 1970. The rivalry came into full-bloom during the 1971 MICAA All-Filipino championship, when Reynoso and Jaworski punched referees Eriberto “Ting” Cruz and Jose “Joe” Obias for what was the duo perceived questionable calls against MERALCO. The incident resulted to lifetime suspensions meter against the two that were lifted eventually so that the two can join the national team in the 1973 Asian Basketball Championship.

The team disbanded in 1972 in the wake of the declaration of Martial Law in the Philippines, wherein the Marcos government seized MERALCO from Eugenio López, Sr.

PBA entry and the Sta. Lucia Realtors franchise acquisition
In June 2010, there were reports that Meralco expressed interest in joining the PBA and intended to buy either Sta. Lucia's or Barako Bull's franchise after both teams unloaded most of their major players. After Barako Bull informed the board that they intended to stay with the league for the 2010–11 season, Sta. Lucia then filed a "leave of absence." On August 10, the PBA board finally approved the sale of the Sta. Lucia franchise to Meralco. The team would be named the Meralco Bolts.

2010–2011 PBA season
The Bolts debuted during the 2010–11 season with a lineup that included Mark Cardona, Asi Taulava, Nelbert Omolon, Marlou Aquino, Beau Belga, Dennis Daa, Chris Ross, Ogie Menor, Pong Escobal and Chris Pacana. Shawn Weinstein, Ford Arao, Khasim Mirza and Bam-bam Gamalinda were the first players to be drafted by the franchise. They started the Philippine Cup with a win against the crowd favorites Barangay Ginebra Kings. In the middle of the conference, they traded some of their players in exchange for Hans Thiele, Mark Isip and Reed Juntilla respectively. They compiled a 7–7 record, which was enough to take them to the quarterfinals. However, they lost to the B-Meg Derby Ace Llamados 2–0. Before the Commissioner's Cup, they made a huge trade by acquiring Solomon Mercado along with Paolo Bugia and Erick Rodriguez. They also signed 3-point shooter Renren Ritualo. Despite a revamped roster and imports Anthony Dandridge and Chamberlain Oguchi, they did not past the eliminations after having a 3–6 record. The same happened during the Governors Cup when they had a 3–5 record.

2011–2012 PBA season
The Bolts rebuilt its line-up during the offseason, releasing Renren Ritualo, Hans Thiele, Reed Juntilla and Paolo Bugia, as well as acquiring through trades Mark Yee, Mark Macapagal, Chico Lanete, Chris Timberlake and signing free agents Mark Borboran and Bryan Faundo. During the 2011 PBA Draft, Meralco selected Gilas reserve Jason Ballesteros, as well as Gilbert Bulawan to augment their frontline. In the 2011-12 PBA Philippine Cup, they finished at 6th place at 8–6 win–loss record but swept by the Petron Blaze Boosters. In the 2012 PBA Commissioner's Cup, they finished at another sixth place at 4–5 on that 102–98 upset win over Powerade Tigers but in another miss to the semifinals for the Bolts. In the 2012 PBA Governors Cup, they finished three straight sixth places in their franchise. In the knockout game for the last semis berth, they defeated the Powerade Tigers, 94–86 to advance to their first semifinals appearance in their franchise history.

2012–2013 PBA season
Ramon Segismundo announced the team's uniform for the 2012–13 season will have similar design features with the 1971 uniforms worn by the Meralco Reddy Kilowatts.

2013–14 season
The Bolts made some offseason moves prior to the start of the season.  They acquired "El Granada" Gary David from GlobalPort in exchange for Chris Ross, Chris Timberlake and Meralco's 2016 and 2017 second round picks.  They have also traded the rights of Asi Taulava to Air21 in exchange for Mike Cortez, shipped Mark Cardona to Air21 via a three-team trade which in the process, acquired Rabeh Al-Hussaini. They also acquired Kerby Raymundo from Ginebra for Jay-R Reyes. Raymundo has yet to play for the Bolts since he was traded because of a nagging knee injury, and is contemplating retirement.

Midway thru the eliminations, they signed up Danny Ildefonso for the rest of the conference, who was unceremoniously let go by Petron.  After realizing that Danny I still has what it takes to play, and can still help the team in terms of his leadership and positive influence, the Bolts signed him for the rest of the season.

During the PBA Philippine Cup conference, they were off to a good start, and were able to beat top-seed teams like Ginebra.  However, they suffered losing streak and ended up in a four-way tie with Alaska, GlobalPort and Barako Bull.  Since Barako Bull and GlobalPort have higher quotients, Meralco was forced to play a sudden death game with Alaska Aces to determine the eighth and final playoff spot.  The Aces defeated them and thus they were eliminated from playoff contention.

2014–15 season
In 2014–15 PBA Philippine Cup conference, they performed well, even eliminating the defending champion Purefoods Star Hotshots, but were later eliminated by Alaska Aces

In 2015 Commissioner's Cup, they are in an undefeated streak due to their good performance. The team also had its import Josh Davis who helped to maintain their great streak.

In the Governor's Cup, the team tapped Seiya Ando as their import, alongside Andre Emmett. Due to this, Ando became the first Japanese import in the league.

2015–16 season
The 2015–16 PBA Philippine Cup was not as good as they had before. They suffered the worst with a 1–10 record. However, the team drafted Chris Newsome and Baser Amer.

The team improved very well in the Commissioner's Cup, where they were led by ex-Maccabi Tel Aviv BC player Arinze Onuaku, who would win the Best Import of the Conference award. The team also went through some setbacks, with the suspension of Gary David in a game during an elimination round, due to insubordination. David was later removed from the line-up and becoming an unrestricted agent list.

The team also went to the Finals for the first time in their franchise history on the Governors' Cup. The Bolts were able to upset the top-seed TNT KaTropa by winning their best-of-five semifinal series in four games. They faced the crowd favorite Barangay Ginebra San Miguel in the Finals. Meralco entered the Finals as the underdogs, but managed to put up a fight and even steal Game 1. Although Ginebra won in six games, it was considered to be one of the most entertaining Finals series in recent memory.
Meralco's import, Allen Durham also won the Best Import award and rookie guard/forward Chris Newsome won Rookie of the Year.

Mascot

"Biboy Liwanag" is the main mascot of the Bolts. He was first introduced as the team's mascot during their maiden season in 2010.

Current roster

Head coaches

Season-by-season records

Records from the 2022–23 PBA season:
*one-game playoffs**team had the twice-to-beat advantage

Players of note

Other notable players

 Jimmy Alapag
 Don Allado
 Sean Anthony
 Marlou Aquino
 Paul Artadi
 Simon Atkins
 Nonoy Baclao
 Beau Belga
 Mark Borboran
 Ronjay Buenafe
 Paolo Bugia
 Gilbert Bulawan
 Mark Cardona
 Justin Chua
 Mike Cortez
 Ed Daquioag
 Gary David
 Pong Escobal
 Gabby Espinas
 John Ferriols
 Riego Gamalinda
 Jonathan Grey
 Rey Guevarra
 Rabeh Al-Hussaini 
 Danny Ildefonso
 Mark Isip
 Chico Lanete
 Mark Macapagal
 Vic Manuel
 Solomon Mercado
 Kelly Nabong 
 Jai Reyes
 Jay-R Reyes
 Ren-Ren Ritualo
 Chris Ross
 Sunday Salvacion
 James Sena
 Asi Taulava
 Jonathan Uyloan
 John Wilson
 Mark Yee
 Joseph Yeo

Imports
 Seiya Ando (2015)
 Earl Barron (2012) 
 Brian Butch (2014)
 Josh Davis (2015)
 Anthony Dandridge (2011)
 Eric Dawson (2013)
 Allen Durham (2016, 2017, 2018, 2019)
 Andre Emmett (2015)
 Jarrid Famous (2012)
 Chamberlain Oguchi (2011, 2011, 2012)
 Arinze Onuaku (2016, 2018)
 Tim Pickett (2011)
 Mario West (2012, 2013, 2014)
 Darnell Jackson (2014)
 Terrence Williams (2014)
 Alex Stepheson (2017)

See also
Meralco Bolts draft history
Meralco Reddy Kilowatts
F.C. Meralco Manila
Meralco Power Spikers

References

External links
One Meralco Sports (official website)

 
Basketball teams established in 2010
2010 establishments in the Philippines